The World Federation of Hemophilia (WFH) is an international non-profit organization dedicated to improving the lives of people with hemophilia (also spelled haemophilia) and other genetic bleeding disorders. It educates people with bleeding disorders and lobbies for improved medical treatment. 75% of people in the world with bleeding disorders do not know it and do not receive care.

The WFH was established by Frank Schnabel in 1963 and has its headquarters in Montreal, Canada. It has member organizations in 147 countries and official recognition from the World Health Organization. The current President is Cesar Garrido.

World Hemophilia Day
World Hemophilia Day is held annually on April 17 by the WFH. It is an awareness day for hemophilia and other bleeding disorders, which also serves to raise funds and attract volunteers for the WFH. It was started in 1989; April 17 was chosen in honor of Frank Schnabel's birthday.

Themes by year
 2021: "Adapting to Change, Sustaining care in a new world"
2020: "Get+Involved"
2018: "Sharing Knowledge Makes Us Stronger"
2017: "Hear their voices"
2016: "Treatment for All, The Vision of All"
2010: "The Many Faces of Bleeding Disorders – United to Achieve Treatment for All"
2009: "Together, We Care"
2008: "Count Me In"
2007: "Improve Your Life!"

References

External links
 

International medical and health organizations
Health charities in Canada